Chris Davidson (born 4 December 1975) is a male English athlete who competed in the long jump event.

Athletics career
Davidson represented England at the 1998 Commonwealth Games in Kuala Lumpur, Malaysia finishing 8th. He also won three British indoor national titles in 1996, 1998 and 1999. He has a personal best distance of 7.90 metres.

References

1975 births
Living people
British male long jumpers
Athletes (track and field) at the 1998 Commonwealth Games
Commonwealth Games competitors for England